Edwin Sass (born ) is a South African rugby union player for Falcons (rugby union) in the Currie Cup. His regular position is centre.

References

South African rugby union players
Living people
1993 births
People from Ceres, Western Cape
Rugby union centres
Boland Cavaliers players
Griquas (rugby union) players
Falcons (rugby union) players
SWD Eagles players
Rugby union players from the Western Cape